USS Warbler is a name the United States Navy has used more than once in naming its ships:

 , laid down on 24 April 1919 by the Philadelphia Navy Yard.
 , laid down on 15 October 1953 at Bellingham, Washington.

References 

United States Navy ship names